This is a list of airlines which have a current Air Operator Certificate issued by the Civil Aviation Authority of Macau. For airlines of Mainland China and Hong Kong, click List of airlines of China, List of airlines of Hong Kong.

Scheduled airlines

Charter airlines

Cross-border Helicopter Service

See also
List of defunct airlines of Asia – includes defunct airlines of Macau
List of airports in Macau

References

Airlines
Macau

Airlines
Macau